Does a Woman Have to Become a Mother? or Paragraph 144 is a 1924 Austrian-German silent film directed by Georg Jacoby and Hans Otto and starring Harry Liedtke. Originally intended as a pro-abortion film, by the time it was released it was advocating the opposite view.

Does a Woman Have to Become a Mother? (1924) is a new edited version of Moral und Sinnlichkeit (1919).

Cast
Rolf Reinhardt as Dr. Unger  
Paul Otto as Dr. Weisse  
Kurt Ehrle as Fritz Hardt
Käthe Dorsch as Else Hardt  
Hanna Ralph as Frau Derstner  
Erika Glässner as Margit 
Carl Auen as Kurt Wolf 
Harry Liedtke as Dr. Hellbrandt  
Hermann Thimig as Alfred Weng
Ellen Blondys as Edith Kramer  
Margarete Kupfer as Frau Klumberger 
Artur Ranzenhofer as Dr. Heller  
Anny Ranzenhofer as arme Mutter

References

External links

Films of the Weimar Republic
Films directed by Georg Jacoby
Films directed by Hans Otto
German silent feature films
Austrian silent feature films
UFA GmbH films
German black-and-white films
Austrian black-and-white films